How Molly Made Good (aka: How Molly Malone Made Good) is a 1915 silent drama film which is one of the first films to feature cameo appearances by major celebrities. It survives in the Library of Congress and is available on DVD. The writer of the film, Burns Mantle, may have been influenced by the globe-trotting adventure of Nellie Bly in 1889, when the reporter circumnavigated the globe in a specified amount of time using several means of conveyance and visiting as many famous cities as possible.

The opera star Madame Fjorde's real name was Grace Fjorde and a real opera singer. She was previously thought to be a created character.

Cast
Marguerite Gale - Molly Malone
Helen Hilton - Alva Hinton, Rival Reporter
John Reedy - Reed, The Photographer
William H. Tooker - Editor
William A. Williams - Journalist
Armand Cortes - Benny the Dip
James Bagley - Morrison, Associate Editor
Edward P. Sullivan - Journalist
Madame Fjorde - Herself, cameo (*aka Grace Fjorde)
Lulu Glaser - Herself, cameo
May Robson - Herself, cameo
Henry Kolker - Himself, cameo
Cyril Scott - Himself, cameo
Julian Eltinge - Himself, cameo
Charles J. Ross - Himself, cameo
Mabel Fenton - Herself, cameo
Robert Edeson - Himself, cameo
Leo Ditrichstein - Himself, cameo
Julia Dean - Herself, cameo
Henrietta Crosman - Herself, cameo

References

External links

The AFI Catalog of Feature Films:How Molly Made Good

1915 films
American silent feature films
Films based on short fiction
1915 drama films
Silent American drama films
American black-and-white films
1910s American films